Chang Kuo-chu (born 17 October 1948) is a Taiwanese actor. He was erroneously declared the winner of the 2007 Golden Bell Award for Best Supporting Actor, because his name was similar to awardee . Both were acknowledged as joint winners.

His son Chang Chen is also an actor.

Selected filmography
The Butterfly Murders (1979)
Stone Age Warriors (1991)
A Brighter Summer Day (1991)
Handsome Siblings (1992)
Mahjong (1996)
Meteor Garden II (2002)
Mars (2004)
The Hospital (2006)
Driverless (2010)
Summer's Desire (2010)
Two Fathers (2013)
Cold War 2 (2016)Guilty of Mind (2017)See You Again (2019)Detective Chinatown'' (2020)

References

External links

1948 births
Living people
20th-century Taiwanese male actors
21st-century Taiwanese male actors
Taiwanese male film actors
Taiwanese male television actors